Cooperdale is an unincorporated community in Coshocton County, in the U.S. state of Ohio.

History
Cooperdale was named for George Cooper, who founded the town when the Cleveland, Akron and Columbus Railroad was extended to that point. A post office was established at Cooperdale in 1888, and remained in operation until 1955.

References

Unincorporated communities in Coshocton County, Ohio
Unincorporated communities in Ohio